Sector Seven, Sector 7, or variations thereon may refer to:

 Sector 7 (book), a wordless picture book created and illustrated by David Wiesner
 Sector 7 (film), a 2011 South Korean 3D science fiction action film directed by Kim Ji-hoon
 Sector 7, one of eleven geographical areas of Bangladesh during the Bangladesh Liberation War
 Sector Seven, a fictional US government agency in the 2007 film Transformers
 Sectorseven, a Canadian punk band from in Grimsby, Ontario
 Sectorseven (album), the third studio album by Sector Seven

See also 
 Area 7 (disambiguation)
 District 7 (disambiguation)